Brougher Mountain transmitting station is a major transmitting station in Northern Ireland.

It has four other transmitter sites in its digital television transmitter group, at Ederny, Derrygonnelly, Belcoo, and Lisbellaw.

Brougher Mountain came into service on 24 February 1964, transmitting the BBC Television Service on VHF 405 lines.

The ITV service provided by Ulster Television launched from the Strabane transmitter located 40 miles north of Brougher Mountain on 18 February 1963 and its coverage extended down to the area covered by Brougher Mountain.

It became the main UHF transmitter for the area in July 1978, when BBC One, BBC Two and UTV started transmitting in colour on the 625 line UHF service. Channel 4 started transmitting from the transmitter in December 1983.

Due to its close proximity to the Republic of Ireland, since the transmitter went on air in 1964, many living in counties Cavan, Monaghan, Donegal, Leitrim, Roscommon and Sligo could receive the UK channels via spill-over signals from Brougher Mountain, as well as the Strabane transmitter.

The site was the location of an Provisional IRA  bombing on the 9th February 1971, which left 5 BBC workers dead when their vehicle was destroyed by a landmine. The workers were travelling up the mountain to repair the transmitter when the landmine, which was detonated by a tripwire, detonated. It has been suggested that the booby trap was in fact set to target members of the British Army, who regularly patrolled in the border area.

Services transmitted by frequency

Analogue radio

Digital radio

Digital television
Including Sept 2019 Frequency changes.

NImux contains TG4, RTÉ One, RTÉ Two and RTÉ Raidió na Gaeltachta and transmits from this and two other sites in Northern Ireland.

Before switchover

Analogue television (before 24 October 2012)

See also 
 Divis transmitting station
 Limavady transmitting station

References

External links 
 Picture of Brougher Mountain from the air

Transmitter sites in Northern Ireland
Buildings and structures in County Fermanagh
1964 establishments in Northern Ireland